Neptune Road is located in the East Boston neighborhood of Boston, Massachusetts. The road is fragmented, bisected by the Massachusetts Bay Transportation Authority's Blue Line which surfaces from the subway southwest of the road. Much of the portion southeast of the train tracks is encompassed within Logan International Airport.

History

Neptune Road once was a residential street that also served as the entrance to Frederick Law Olmsted's Wood Island Park, a 47-acre waterfront park designed by Olmsted in the 19th Century. An elegant tree-lined road with center islands, The Boston Globe referred to the street as a “miniature Commonwealth Avenue”.

The expansion of Logan Airport in the late 1960s and early 1970s displaced families along Neptune Road, which is now used for warehouses and rental car property. As the airport expanded, planes flew in low over the residential blocks and conflicts with airport officials escalated. Wood Island Park was leveled early one morning in 1967. On April 23, 1969, 35 workmen with 35 chain saws toppled 35 elms along the road.

The airport has since implemented four "airport edge buffers," which include parks and greenery. Some of Boston's last surviving elm trees are still located on Neptune Road, resisting the Dutch elm disease that have felled most of the Boston-area elms in the 20th Century.

See also
East Boston
Logan International Airport
Massachusetts Port Authority

References

Image gallery

External links

 40-Year-Old Images Show East Boston Grappling With an Expanding Logan Airport
 Ghosts of East Boston past and present
 East Boston Neighborhood Close to Destruction After 40 Year Fight
 The disappearance of Neptune Road | Looking Backward
 The final days of 18 Neptune Rd

Streets in Boston
History of Boston
East Boston
Logan International Airport